James Allen Gähres (born August 5, 1943  in Harrisburg, Pennsylvania) is an American conductor, based in Germany.

Biography
Gähres studied music, conducting, composition and piano at the Peabody Conservatory of Music in Baltimore, where he was musical assistant of the Peabody Symphony Orchestra in his final study year, and as a Fulbright-Fellowship holder with Hans Swarovsky at the University of Music and Performing Arts Vienna. He attended Master classes with Bruno Maderna in Salzburg.

Gähres began his conducting career began after several years as a freelance composer and pianist in southern Germany.  He worked as a conductor at several opera houses in Germany, including 10 years as first Kapellmeister at the Staatsoper Hannover.  Then he was engaged as the first conductor at the Staatstheater Braunschweig for three years.  His work in Germany included conducting the German premiere of Leonard Bernstein's Candide, in the Scottish Opera version, at the Deutsche Oper Berlin, at the invitation of Götz Friedrich.  He also worked regularly with the Lower Saxony Youth Symphony Orchestra and the Youth Symphony Orchestra of the Saarland on concert tours, in Israel, Spain, the United States, France, Great Britain and Canada.

From 1994 to 2011, Gähres was Generalmusikdirektor (General Music Director, GMD) at the Theater Ulm, which also encompassed the post of chief conductor of the Ulm Philharmonic Orchestra.  During his Ulm tenure, Gähres founded the tradition of the New Year's concerts and of the Herbert von Karajan Memorial concerts.  He recorded more than 15 CDs as chief conductor in Ulm.

{{Listen|filename=Ludwig van Beethoven - Overture to 'Coriolan', Op. 62.ogg|thumb|title=Overture to 'Coriolan'''|description=Ludwig van Beethoven - Overture to 'Coriolan', Op. 62 conducted by James Allen Gähres}}

Selected discography
 Selections from 'Der Ring des Nibelungen' by Richard Wagner; Ulm Philharmonic. Conductor: James Allen Gähres. EAN 4019981662127
 Symphony concerts; Angela Denoke (soprano), Tamás Füzesi (violin), Ulm Philharmonic. Conductor: James Allen Gähres. EAN 4019981662080
 Johann Strauß 1899–1999; An der schönen blauen Donau - Neujahrskonzerte; Ulm Philharmonic. Conductor: James Allen Gähres. EAN 4019981662097
 Christmas concert; Ulm Philharmonic. Conductor: James Allen Gähres. EAN 4019981662141
 Great moments Vol. 1, First Live Recordings of Carmen-Suite, Self-portrait and Two tangos by Albéniz by Rodion Shchedrin; Ulm Philharmonic. Conductor: James Allen Gähres. EAN 4019981662202
 Angela Denoke: Singer of the Year 1999 - a reminiscence of the years in Ulm''; Angela Denoke (soprano), Ulm Philharmonic. Conductor: James Allen Gähres. EAN 4019981662134
 Requiem (K. 626) and the Maurerische Trauermusik (K. 477) by Wolfgang Amadeus Mozart; Ulmer Kantorei, Ulm Philharmonic. Conductor: James Allen Gähres. EAN 4019981662172
 Piano Concerto No. 5, Op. 73 by Beethoven and the Symphonic Dances, Op. 45 by Sergei Rachmaninoff; Ulm Philharmonic. Conductor: James Allen Gähres. EAN 4019981662110
 Beethoven: Coriolan Overture, Op. 62 and the Symphony No. 5, Op. 67; Ulm Philharmonic. Conductor: James Allen Gähres. EAN 4019981662103

References

External links

 
 Portrait James Allen Gähres, Generalmusikdirektor, Theater Ulm
Portrait of James Allen Gähres, on the Kultiversum website
Short portrait James A. Gähres, on the Theatre Ulm Archives website
James Allen Gähres at YouTube

American male conductors (music)
20th-century American conductors (music)
21st-century American conductors (music)
Peabody Institute alumni
University of Music and Performing Arts Vienna alumni
Music directors
Music directors (opera)
20th-century American composers
American male classical composers
American classical composers
Musicians from Harrisburg, Pennsylvania
American expatriate musicians
American expatriates in Germany
1943 births
Living people
20th-century American pianists
American male pianists
Classical musicians from Pennsylvania
21st-century American pianists
20th-century American male musicians
21st-century American male musicians